Cardinal Lambertini (Italian: Il cardinale Lambertini) is a 1934 Italian historical comedy film directed by Parsifal Bassi and starring Ermete Zacconi, Isa Miranda and Giulietta De Riso. It is based on the 1905 play of the same name by Alfredo Testoni, the title role of which Zacconi had played for many years on stage. The film was remade in 1954 starring Gino Cervi.

It was shot at the Bovisa Studios in Milan. The film's sets were designed by the art director Otha Sforza.

Synopsis
Shortly before he became Pope Benedict XIV, Cardinal Lambertini has to mediate between the Spanish forces occupying Bologna and local nobility who bitterly resent them.

Cast
 Ermete Zacconi as Cardinal Lambertini
 Ernes Zacconi as Maria
 Isa Miranda as Anna
 Giulietta De Riso as Isabella Pietramelara
 Franco Becci as Count Davia
 Calisto Bertramo as Pietramelara
 Giuseppe Galeati as Peggi
 Luciano Molinari as Des Brosses
 Aldo Silvani as Carlo
 Letizia Bonini		
 Pia De Doses	
 Fernanda Fassy 	
 Maria Wronska

References

Bibliography
 Mancini, Elaine. Struggles of the Italian Film Industry During Fascism, 1930-1935. UMI Research Press, 1985.

External links

1934 films
Films directed by Parsifal Bassi
Italian black-and-white films
1930s Italian-language films
Italian historical comedy films
1930s historical comedy films
Films set in the 1730s
Films set in Bologna
Films shot in Milan
1934 comedy films
Italian films based on plays
1930s Italian films